Madhava Tirtha was a Hindu philosopher, scholar and the third pontiff of Madhvacharya peetha, from 1333 to 1350, succeeding Narahari Tirtha.

Life

Works
According to S. K. and Gurucarya, he wrote a commentary on Parasara Smriti called Parasara Madhwa-vijaya. He also made commentaries on Rigveda, Yajurveda and Samaveda. His disciple, Sri Madhuhari Teertha, founded a mutt which exists under the name "Majjigenahalli Matha" near Mulbagal.

References

Bibliography

 

Madhva religious leaders
Dvaita Vedanta
Scholars from Karnataka
Uttaradi Math
Dvaitin philosophers
History of Karnataka
14th-century Indian philosophers